Najas tenuis is a species of aquatic plant found in freshwater habitats, especially still or slow-moving waters, like ponds and rice fields.

Description

Distribution and habitat
The natural distribution of this annual plant is India and Myanmar.

References

tenuis
Aquatic plants
Flora of India (region)
Flora of Sri Lanka
Flora of Myanmar